C. turricula may refer to:
 Carelia turricula, an extinct land snail species endemic to the Hawaiian Islands
 Crassispira turricula, a sea snail species

See also 
 Turricula (disambiguation)